Lorraine Ann Voles is an American political advisor who has served as chief of staff to the vice president of the United States since 2022.

Education 
Voles earned a Bachelor of Arts degree in journalism and a Master of Arts in organizational leadership from the George Washington University.

Career 
Voles worked for the Walter Mondale 1984 presidential campaign and Michael Dukakis 1988 presidential campaign. She also worked as a project manager for the Natural Resources Defense Council and served as deputy White House press secretary during the first year of the Clinton administration. From 1993 to 1997, she served as director of communications for Vice President Al Gore. From 1998 to 2006, Voles worked as an independent communications consultant for organizations including Porter Novelli, the Smithsonian Institution, EMILY's List, and the Democratic National Committee. In 2006 and 2007, she served as director of communications for then-Senator Hillary Clinton. From 2007 to 2009, she was the senior vice president of Fannie Mae for communications and marketing. She was also the vice president of George Washington University for external relations in 2009 and 2010. In the summer of 2021, Voles joined the Office of the Vice President of the United States as a senior advisor and was promoted to chief of staff in April 2022.

Personal life 
In 1992, Voles married Daniel Edward Smith, a lawyer and native of Buffalo Center, Iowa. Smith worked for the Al Gore 1988 presidential campaign, American Cancer Society, and various members of the United States Senate before founding an independent consulting firm.

References 

Living people
Chiefs of Staff to the Vice President of the United States
Clinton administration personnel
Biden administration personnel
George Washington University alumni
Political consultants
Year of birth missing (living people)